Anna Lindsay may refer to:

 Anna Robertson Brown Lindsay (1864–1948), first woman to earn a doctorate at the University of Pennsylvania
 Anna Lindsay (activist) (1845–1903), Scottish women's activist

See also 
 Anne Lindsay (disambiguation)